State Highway 43 (SH-43) is a  state highway located in Bonneville County, Idaho. SH-43 runs from its southern terminus at U.S. Route 26 (US-26) in Beachs Corner to its northern terminus at US-20 in Ucon. The highway is maintained by the Idaho Transportation Department.

Route description
SH-43 begins at an intersection with U.S. Route 26 controlled by a traffic light in the community of Beachs Corner. The highway heads north as the Yellowstone Highway past several businesses and a residential district before entering a rural area. It crosses Willow Creek  after passing 77th Road and enters a residential area at an intersection with 81st Road. After returning to a rural environment, SH-43 crosses a canal and continues north past 97th Road. It enters the city of Ucon, passing an auto parts yard to the west. The highway turns west onto 4th Street and continues northeast across a railroad. It leaves the Ucon city limits before terminating at U.S. Route 20.

Major intersections

References

043
Transportation in Bonneville County, Idaho